"Frame-Up for Murder" is a Nero Wolfe mystery novella by Rex Stout, serialized in three issues of The Saturday Evening Post (June 21, June 28 and July 5, 1958).

An expanded rewrite of the 1958 novella "Murder Is No Joke", "Frame-Up for Murder" did not appear in book form until the 1985 Bantam Books release, Death Times Three.

Publication History

"Frame-Up for Murder"
1958, The Saturday Evening Post, June 21 + June 28 + July 5, 1958

Death Times Three
1985, New York: Bantam Books  December 1985, paperback
1995, New York: Bantam Books  January 2, 1995, trade paperback
2000, Newport Beach, California: Books on Tape, Inc.  September 27, 2000, audio cassette (unabridged, read by Michael Prichard)
2010, New York: Bantam  May 5, 2010, e-book

References

External links

1958 short stories
Nero Wolfe short stories
Works originally published in The Saturday Evening Post